Razi School is an Islamic school in Woodside, New York. The school has partnered with NYC Department of Early Childhood Education in offering tuition-free full day Pre-Kindergarten classes for all 4-year-old children.

Razi School is in the same building as the Islamic Institute of New York.

References

External links

Schools in Queens, New York
Private elementary schools in New York (state)
Private middle schools in New York (state)
Private high schools in New York (state)
Islamic schools in New York (state)